Lygodactylus gutturalis, also known as the Uganda dwarf gecko or chevron-throated dwarf gecko, is a species of gecko. It is widely distributed in Sub-Saharan Africa from near the Equator northward. Subspecies Lygodactylus gutturalis dysmicus is endemic to Cameroon, and subspecies Lygodactylus gutturalis paurospilus to Tanzania.

References

Lygodactylus
Reptiles of West Africa
Fauna of Benin
Reptiles of Cameroon
Reptiles of the Central African Republic
Reptiles of the Democratic Republic of the Congo
Reptiles of Ethiopia
Fauna of the Gambia
Fauna of Ghana
Fauna of Guinea
Fauna of Guinea-Bissau
Reptiles of Kenya
Fauna of Nigeria
Reptiles of Somalia
Fauna of Senegal
Fauna of Sudan
Reptiles of Tanzania
Fauna of Togo
Reptiles described in 1873
Taxa named by José Vicente Barbosa du Bocage